Helen Margaret Rockel (born 1949) is a New Zealand artist.

Background 
Rockel was born in 1949 in Wanganui, New Zealand. She attended the Ilam School of Fine Arts between 1968 and 1971, receiving an Honours in painting.

Career 
Known as a painter, her work is notable for its vivid realism and feminist references. Many of Rockel's paintings are portraits, often influenced by her travels through Turkey, Iraq, Iran, Pakistan, Nepal and India.

Rockel has exhibited with the Canterbury Society of Arts and The Group in 1973 and 1975. In 1975 she was part of the exhibition Six Women Artists, organised by Allie Eagle at the Robert McDougall Art Gallery, exhibiting with Stephanie Sheehan, Joanna Harris, Rhondda Bosworth, Joanne Hardy, and Jane Arbuckle.

Her works are held in collections at the Museum of New Zealand Te Papa Tongarewa and Christchurch Art Gallery Te Puna o Waiwhetu.

References

Further reading 
Artist files for Helen Rockel are held at:
 E. H. McCormick Research Library, Auckland Art Gallery Toi o Tāmaki
 Robert and Barbara Stewart Library and Archives, Christchurch Art Gallery Te Puna o Waiwhetu
 Hocken Collections Uare Taoka o Hākena
 Macmillan Brown Library, University of Canterbury
Also see:
 Concise Dictionary of New Zealand Artists McGahey, Kate (2000) Gilt Edge

External links 
 Official website

Living people
New Zealand painters
Ilam School of Fine Arts alumni
People from Christchurch
Artists from Whanganui
New Zealand women painters
1949 births
People associated with the Museum of New Zealand Te Papa Tongarewa
People associated with the Canterbury Society of Arts
Feminist artists
People associated with The Group (New Zealand art)